Romaine may refer to:

Places
 Romaine, Tasmania, Australia, a suburb of Burnie
 Romaine (Saône), a river in eastern France
 La Romaine, Haute-Saône, a commune in France
 La Romaine, Quebec, Canada, an Indian reserve
 La Romaine, Quebec (unconstituted locality), a small community at the mouth of the Olomane River adjacent to the Indian reserve
 La Romaine, Trinidad and Tobago
 Romaine River, a 500 kilometre river in the Côte-Nord region of Quebec that flows into the Gulf of St. Lawrence

Other uses
 Romaine lettuce, a variety of lettuce
 Romaine (name), a list of people and fictional characters with the surname or given name
 Romaine-class frigate, a French Navy class designed in 1794
 French frigate Romaine (1794), lead ship of the class
 Romaine Complex, a hydroelectric complex on the Romaine River in Quebec, which includes four generating stations
 Romaine-1 Generating Station, a 270 megawatt hydroelectric generating station at the Romain hydroelectric complex
 Romaine-2 Generating Station, a 640 megawatt hydroelectric generating station at the Romain hydroelectric complex
 Romaine-3 Generating Station, a 395 megawatt hydroelectric generating station at the Romain hydroelectric complex

See also
 Romain (disambiguation)